James Andrew Seddon CH (7 May 1868 – 31 May 1939) was a British trades unionist and politician. Originally a member of the Labour Party, he subsequently moved to the National Democratic and Labour Party.

Biography
Seddon was born in Prescot, Lancashire in 1868. Having served an apprenticeship as a grocer, he spent ten years working as a commercial traveller. He subsequently became the delegate of the St Helens branch of the National Amalgamated Union of Shop Assistants, Warehousemen and Clerks. He was elected as vice-president and then president of the union in 1901 and 1902.

In 1906 he was elected Labour MP for Newton, Lancashire. He held the seat at the subsequent general election in January, 1910, but was defeated by 144 votes in the December 1910 poll. Seddon continued his work with the union movement, was reselected as Labour candidate for Newton and elected a member of the parliamentary committee of the Trades Union Congress in 1911. In 1915 he was elected President of the TUC.

In 1915 Seddon became a founding member of the Socialist National Defence Committee. The SNDC was short-lived, becoming part of the British Workers League in 1916. In 1917 he resigned from the Labour Party, citing a "change of view" caused by the First World War.

In late spring 1918 the British Worker's League resolved to become a parliamentary party. The National Democratic and Labour Party (British Workers League) or NDP was duly formed as a "patriotic working-class party".

At the 1918 general election Seddon successfully contested the Hanley constituency for the NDP, becoming one of the new party's nine MPs. He had the support of the coalition government, and therefore did not face opposition from either the Conservative or Liberal Parties. He was vice-chairman of the party in the Commons from 1918, before becoming chairman in 1920. he was made a Companion of Honour in 1918. Seddon's parliamentary career came to an end in 1922: along with the other NDP MPs he lost his seat at the October general election, despite campaigning as a "National Liberal". He later joined the Conservative Party.

Seddon continued his interest in politics outside of parliament. In 1925 he helped found the Steel House Constructors Union, claiming a programme of building steel houses could employ 150,000 men. He became a member of the Industrial Peace Union of the British Empire formed after the General Strike of 1926.

J. A. Seddon died of a heart attack at his home in New Barnet, Middlesex on 31 May 1939, aged 71.

References

External links 
 

1868 births
1939 deaths
Labour Party (UK) MPs for English constituencies
British trade union leaders
National Amalgamated Union of Shop Assistants, Warehousemen and Clerks-sponsored MPs
National Democratic and Labour Party MPs
UK MPs 1906–1910
UK MPs 1910
UK MPs 1918–1922
Members of the Order of the Companions of Honour
Members of the Parliamentary Committee of the Trades Union Congress
Presidents of the Trades Union Congress
National Liberal Party (UK, 1922) politicians
Conservative Party (UK) politicians